Tibor Balog (born 1 March 1966) is a football manager and retired Hungarian midfielder.

References

1966 births
Living people
Hungarian footballers
MTK Budapest FC players
Vác FC players
R. Charleroi S.C. players
Maccabi Ironi Ashdod F.C. players
Hapoel Be'er Sheva F.C. players
R.A.E.C. Mons players
Association football midfielders
Hungarian expatriate footballers
Expatriate footballers in Belgium
Hungarian expatriate sportspeople in Belgium
Expatriate footballers in Israel
Hungarian expatriate sportspeople in Israel
Hungary international footballers
Hungarian football managers
Expatriate football managers in Belgium
R. Charleroi S.C. managers
Liga Leumit players